Katsuyoshi (written: , ,  or ) is a masculine Japanese given name. Notable people with the name include:

, Japanese footballer
, Japanese footballer
, Japanese golfer
, Japanese screenwriter, anime director and sound director

Japanese masculine given names